Jackson Township is one of ten townships in Andrew County, Missouri, United States. As of the 2010 census, its population was 620.

Jackson Township was organized in 1846, and named after an early settler.

Geography
It contains three cemeteries: Clizer, Gillispie and Jackson.

Transportation
Jackson Township contains one airport, Cole Landing Strip.

References

 USGS Geographic Names Information System (GNIS)

External links
 US-Counties.com
 City-Data.com

Townships in Andrew County, Missouri
Townships in Missouri